Early One Morning is a 2011 French-Belgian drama film directed by Jean-Marc Moutout.

Cast
 Jean-Pierre Darroussin as Paul
 Valérie Dréville as Françoise
 Xavier Beauvois as Alain Fisher
 Yannick Renier as Fabrice Van Listeich
 Laurent Delbecque as Benoît
 Ralph Amoussou as Youssef
 Aladin Reibel as Antoine
 Pierre Aussedat as Foucade
 François Chattot as Lancelin
 Nelly Antignac as Clarisse
 Frédéric Leidgens as Doctor Hogard
 Jacques Bonnaffé as The phone friend

References

External links
 

2011 films
2011 drama films
Belgian drama films
French drama films
2010s French-language films
Films produced by Margaret Ménégoz
Drama films based on actual events
French-language Belgian films
2010s French films